Del Henney (24 July 1935 in Anfield, Liverpool – 14 January 2019) was a British actor.

Early life
After an education at the Liverpool Collegiate School, Henney served in the British Army and graduated from RADA in 1965.

Career

Film
Henney's film roles included Charlie Venner in Sam Peckinpah's Straw Dogs (1971). In addition to stage and film work, he appeared in numerous television productions.

Television
Henney appeared as characters in numerous British television series such as Eddie Boyse, a career criminal in The Sweeney episode Jigsaw (1975); as Sergeant Hollywake a member of the Royal Flying Corps in the Wings episode Zeppelin (1978) and as Harold Jackson in the Heartbeat episode Changing Places (1992).

Filmography

Film
When Eight Bells Toll (1971) – Dungeon Guard
Villain (1971) – Webb
Straw Dogs (1971) – Charlie Venner
Brannigan (1975) – Drexel
Joseph Andrews (1977) – Didapper's Valet
Soldier of Orange (1977) – Sergeant
Swing (1999) – Colin
Going Off Big Time (2000) – George Hannassey
Devil's Playground (2010) – Dr. Michael Brooke

Television
Coronation Street (1971) – Eddie Duncan
The Sweeney (1975, TV Series) – Eddie Boyse
Fallen Hero (1978–1979, TV Series) – Gareth Hopkins
The Professionals (1978–1983, TV Series) – Quinn / Benny Marsh
Juliet Bravo (1980–1984, TV Series) – Derrick Williams / Pat Garfield / Detective Sergeant Gordon Cole
Doctor Who – Resurrection of the Daleks (1984, TV Series) – Colonel Archer
A Woman of Substance (1985, TV Mini-Series) – Jack Harte
Minder (1989, TV Series) – Tombo
Heartbeat (1992, TV Series) – Harold Jackson
Liverpool 1 (1999, TV Series) – Mr Mackie

References

External links

1935 births
2019 deaths
20th-century British Army personnel
Alumni of RADA
British male film actors
British male stage actors
British male television actors
Male actors from Liverpool